Dhari is one of the 182 Legislative Assembly constituencies of Gujarat state in India. It is part of Amreli district, and is a segment of Amreli Lok Sabha constituency.

List of segments

This assembly seat represents the following segments,

 Dhari Taluka
 Bagasara Taluka – Entire taluka except village – Kadaya
 Khambha Taluka (Part) Villages – Samadhiyala Mota, Rugnathpur, Jikiyali, Vankiya, Kotda, Anida, Ingorala, Bhad, Visavadar, Dhari Nani, Lasa, Tantaniya, Umariya, Nanudi, Dadhiyali, Khambha, Pipalava, Gidardi, Dhavadiya, Bhaniya, Khadadhar, Bhavardi, Sarakadiya – Divana, Sarakadiya, Kodiya, Pati, Raydi

Members of Vidhan Sabha

Election results

2022

2020

2017

2012

1995
 Kotadia Manubhai Naranbhai (INC) : 25,455 votes   
 Gajera, Himatbhai Haribhai (BJP) : 17,729

See also
 List of constituencies of the Gujarat Legislative Assembly
 Gujarat Legislative Assembly
 Amreli district

References

External links
 

Assembly constituencies of Gujarat
Amreli district